Bixby is a virtual assistant developed by Samsung Electronics. It runs on various Samsung branded appliances, primarily mobile devices but also on some refrigerators. Bixby was launched in 2017, replacing the previous S Voice assistant.

History
On 20 March 2017, Samsung announced the voice-powered digital assistant named "Bixby". Bixby was introduced alongside the Samsung Galaxy S8 and S8+, as well as the Samsung Galaxy Tab A during the Samsung Galaxy Unpacked 2017 event, which was held on 29 March 2017. Samsung officially unveiled Bixby a week before launch but it only made its first appearance during the event. Bixby can also be sideloaded on older Galaxy devices running Android Nougat.

In October 2017, Samsung announced the release of Bixby 2.0 during its annual developer conference in San Francisco. The then-new version was rolled out across the company's line of connected products, including smartphones, TVs, and refrigerators. Also, third parties are allowed to develop applications for Bixby using the Samsung Developer Kit.

In June 2021, screenshots surfaced for a replacement to Bixby. The three-dimensional virtual assistant, Sam, was popular on social media though it was unclear whether Samsung devices would include full voice and virtual assistance.

Features
Bixby comes in three parts, known as "Bixby Voice", "Bixby Vision", "Bixby Home" (which has been recently replaced with "Samsung Free" in the latest One UI software update), which Samsung had recently started developing.

"Bixby Voice" is the name for the method of activating Bixby by calling it or doing a long press of the Bixby Button, located below the volume rocker. A while before the phone's release, the Bixby Button was reprogrammable and could be set to open other applications or assistants, such as Google Assistant. However, near the phone's release, this ability was removed with a firmware update but can be remapped using third-party apps. "Bixby Vision" is an augmented reality camera that can identify objects in real-time and potentially offer the user to purchase them online, translate text, read QR codes, and recognize landmarks. "Bixby Home" is a vertically scrolling list of information that Bixby can interact with, for example weather, fitness activity and buttons for controlling their smart home gadgets. "Bixby Touch" makes recommendations based on intelligent recognition. You can easily access services such as translation, online shopping, and media by touching the screen. This app is still in its development period and hasn't been publicly released yet. Of course, its APK has been publicly leaked and can be installed and used with some workaround.

At the beginning Bixby supported three languages: English, Korean and Chinese. It also supports contextual search and visual search.

You can use Bixby to text, get tailored information about the weather, reminders of meetings, news articles, and so on. Also it learns more about what it sees with the camera, and complete actions. It can learn individual voices, so it can personalize its answers.

Language and country availability
Samsung reported that Bixby would not be operational on the US version of the Samsung Galaxy S8 and S8+ when the devices were first shipped to customers on 21 April 2017. Samsung stated that the key features of Bixby, including Vision, Home and Reminder, would be available with the global launch of the smartphones. Bixby Voice was intended to be made available in the US on the Galaxy S8 and S8+ later that spring. However, the release of the English version was postponed as Samsung had problems getting Bixby to fully understand the language.

As of April 2018, Bixby is available in over 195 countries, but only in Korean, English (US only), and Chinese (Mandarin). The Chinese version of Bixby is only available on devices officially sold in Mainland China. Bixby Korean was launched on 1 May 2017 (KST).

As of December 2018, Samsung has deployed Bixby's voice command function in French.

On 20 February 2019, Samsung announced the addition of further languages: English (British), German, Italian and Spanish (Spain).

On 22 February 2020, Samsung announced the addition of Portuguese (Brazil), for Galaxy S10 & Note10, in Beta, and later for other models.

Compatible devices

Flagship smartphones and tablets

Galaxy S 
Samsung Galaxy S7 (including S7 Edge and S7 Active)
Samsung Galaxy S8 (including S8+ and S8 Active)
Samsung Galaxy S9 (including S9+)
Samsung Galaxy S10 (including S10+, S10e, S10 5G and S10 Lite)
Samsung Galaxy S20 (including S20+, S20 Ultra, and S20 FE)
Samsung Galaxy S21 (including S21+ and S21 Ultra, and S21 FE)
Samsung Galaxy S22 (including S22+ and S22 Ultra)
Samsung Galaxy S23 (including S23+ and S23 Ultra)

Galaxy Tab S 
Samsung Galaxy Tab S4
Samsung Galaxy Tab S5e 
Samsung Galaxy Tab S6 (including Tab S6 Lite)
Samsung Galaxy Tab S7 (including Tab S7+)
Samsung Galaxy Tab S8 (including Tab S8+ and Tab S8 Ultra)

Galaxy Note 
Samsung Galaxy Note FE (Bixby Home, Reminder and Vision only [Vision available on Android Oreo]; S Voice used instead)
Samsung Galaxy Note 8
Samsung Galaxy Note 9
Samsung Galaxy Note 10 (including Note 10+, Note 10 5G, Note 10+ 5G and Note 10 Lite)
Samsung Galaxy Note 20 (including Note 20 Ultra, Note 20 5G and Note 20 Ultra 5G)

Galaxy Fold / Z 
Samsung Galaxy Fold
Samsung Galaxy Z Flip
Samsung Galaxy Z Fold 2
Samsung Galaxy Z Fold 3
Samsung Galaxy Z Fold 4
Samsung Galaxy Z Flip 3
Samsung Galaxy Z Flip 4

Mid-range smartphones and tablets

Galaxy A 
Samsung Galaxy A6/A6+ (Bixby Home, Reminder and Vision)
Samsung Galaxy A7 (2017) (available to users in South Korea only; Bixby Home and Reminder only)
Samsung Galaxy A7 (2018) (Bixby Home, Reminder and Vision only)
Samsung Galaxy A8 (2018) (including A8 Star; Bixby Home, Reminder and Vision only; S Voice used instead)
Samsung Galaxy A9 (2018) 
Samsung Galaxy A20 (Bixby Home and Service)
Samsung Galaxy A21s
Samsung Galaxy A30s (Bixby Home, Vision, Reminder and Routines)
Samsung Galaxy A40 (Bixby Home and Reminder)
Samsung Galaxy A41 (Bixby Home, Vision, Routines and Reminder)
Samsung Galaxy A50 (Bixby Home, Voice, Vision, Reminder and Routines)
Samsung Galaxy A50s (Bixby Home, Voice, Vision, Reminder and Routines)
Samsung Galaxy A51 
Samsung Galaxy A52
Samsung Galaxy A52s
Samsung Galaxy A53 5G
Samsung Galaxy A70 (Bixby Home, Voice, Vision and Reminder)
Samsung Galaxy A70s (Bixby Home, Voice, Vision and Reminder)
Samsung Galaxy A71 
Samsung Galaxy A72
Samsung Galaxy A73 5G
Samsung Galaxy A80 (Bixby Home, Voice, Vision, Reminder and Routines)
Samsung Galaxy A73 5G

Galaxy F 
Samsung Galaxy F62

Galaxy Tab A 
Samsung Galaxy Tab A 10.1 (2016) (Bixby Home)
Samsung Galaxy Tab A 8.0 (2017) (Bixby Home and Reminder only)
Samsung Galaxy Tab A 10.5 (2018) (Bixby Home, Reminder and Vision)

Galaxy J 
 Samsung Galaxy J4 (2018) (Bixby Home)
 Samsung Galaxy J7+ (2017)
 Samsung Galaxy J6 (2018)
 Samsung Galaxy J6+ (2018)

Galaxy C 
Samsung Galaxy C8 (Bixby Home, Reminder and Bixby Vision only)

Smart speakers 
Galaxy Home
Galaxy Home Mini

See also

References 

2017 software
Mobile software
Natural language processing software
Samsung software
Virtual assistants